, also known by  and his Chinese style name , was a bureaucrat of Ryukyu Kingdom.

Kunigami was the originator of an aristocrat family called Shō-uji Ōgimi Dunchi. He was a son of Urasoe Chōshi, and was also an elder brother of Urasoe Chōri. He was elected as a member of Sanshikan in 1622.

In 1633, King Shō Hō dispatched him and Sai Ken (also known as Kiyuna Pekumi ) as a gratitude envoy for his investiture to Ming China. Kunigami requested for permission to pay tribute twice every three years just like before the country was invaded by Satsuma. It was approved by Chongzhen Emperor. Two years later, Kunigami was serious ill on the way home and died in Fujian Province.

References

1635 deaths
Ueekata
Sanshikan
People of the Ryukyu Kingdom
Ryukyuan people
17th-century Ryukyuan people